Tribasic may refer to:
 A tribasic, or triprotic acid, containing three potential protons to donate
 A tribasic salt, with three hydrogen atoms, with respect to the parent acid, replaced by cations

See also

Monobasic (disambiguation)
Dibasic (disambiguation)
Polybasic (disambiguation)

Chemical nomenclature